The  is an electric multiple unit (EMU) commuter train type operated by the Hokuso Railway on the Hokuso Line in Japan since 1992.

Design
Based on the Keisei 3700 series design, two eight-car sets were introduced in 1992. Four further sets, numbered 7808–7838, were added from 2003, modified from former Keisei 3700 series sets.

Formation

, the fleet consists of two eight-car 7300 series sets and three eight-car 7800 series sets formed as shown below, with six motored (M) cars and two trailer (T) cars, and car 1 at the southern end.

The 7800 series set cars are numbered in the "78xx" series. The two M1 cars each have two single-arm pantographs, and the M1' car has one.

Former identities
The 7800 series sets were formerly numbered as follows.

Incidents 
On 12 June 2020, the seventh car of set 7818 derailed while manoeuvering at Aoto Station. According to witnesses, the pantograph on the derailed car had detached from the train and became entangled with the overhead wire.

See also
 Chiba New Town Railway 9800 series, a similar design owned by the Chiba New Town Railway

References

External links

 Hokuso Railway fleet information 

Electric multiple units of Japan
Train-related introductions in 1992
1500 V DC multiple units of Japan